Cystiscus pardus is a species of very small sea snail, a marine gastropod mollusk or micromollusk from the family Cystiscidae.

Description
The shell of C. pardus is translucent, and white. The shells have been observed to grow up to 1.55 mm long and 1mm wide. They can be identified by their flat spire, smooth inner shell lip, and 3 ridged plaits on their columellar fold.  

The snail C. pardus has a bifurcated head and red eyes. The snail's foot has a cloudy patten of yellow and white. Its mantle is yellow with densely packed blue leopard spots which can be seen through the shell.

Distribution
This species occurs in marine reefs off the north west coast of New Caledonia. It has been observed at two stations near the coast of Kuomac. It lives from depths between 15 to 20m.

References

Cystiscidae
Gastropods described in 2003
Pardus